C/S (originally known as Crime/Suspense) is an entertainment channel owned by Solar Entertainment Corporation. It shows mostly American crime and suspense dramas, mysteries, reality, science fiction and action shows. It is the successor to Solar USA, after the latter was replaced by Jack TV.  C/S is shown on cable networks throughout the Philippines.

History
Crime/Suspense started operations as Solar USA. In 2005, Jack TV replaced Solar USA and a separate new channel, Crime/Suspense, started test broadcasting on October 15, 2005. On January 1, 2008, the channel became C/S and is now being both on as a cable channel and as a free TV channel through Radio Philippines Network (RPN) (which currently broadcast as CNN Philippines).

While C/S would retain its official original abbreviation meaning (Crime/Suspense), RPN added a second meaning, Conservation/Survival, as RPN and Solar Entertainment's joint commitment for environment and ecological awareness.

C/S on RPN had its major revamp on October 4, 2008, and later became C/S 9, while C/S on Cable TV remains as C/S Origin.

C/S Origin

The cable TV C/S was relaunched as a new channel called C/S Origin. This channel started airing on  September 14, 2008, in Global Destiny Cable.

Former Shows

RPN Programs
Home Shopping Network
Malacanang Press Conference
RPN NewsWatch First Edition
RPN NewsWatch Junior Edition
RPN NewsWatch Second Edition
RPN NewsWatch Update
One Morning
RPN NewsWatch Aksyon Balita (January 1–4, 2008)
RPN iWatch News (January 1–4, 2008)
RPN News Update (January 1–4, 2008)
Sagip Bayan
The Working President

C/S Originals

Procedural Drama
 24
 Bones
 Close to Home
 Cold Case
 Law & Order: Criminal Intent
 Law & Order: Special Victims Unit
 Law & Order
 La Femme Nikita (TV series)
 The Kill Point
 New Amsterdam
 Prison Break
 The Closer
 The Nine
 The Sopranos
 The Unit
 Without A Trace

Science Fiction
 Battlestar Galactica
 Bionic Woman
 Eureka
 Heroes
 Moonlight
 The X-Files

Comedy
 Chuck
 Psych

Reality Series
 American Gladiators
 Who Wants to be a Superhero?

C/S Chronicles

Documentary/Factuals
 7 Deadly Hollywood Sins
 Dominick Dunne: Power, Privilege, & Justice
 World's Most Amazing Videos
 Maximum Exposure

C/S Movie Blocks
 Big Hit Movies
 C/S Blockbusters
 C/S Movie Mania

Sports
 NBA on C/S9
 PBA on C/S9
 WWE Raw
 WWE SmackDown
 WWE Pay-Per View Events

Anime Series
  Yu-Gi-Oh!

References

External links
C/S 9 official website (Old, backed)

Defunct television networks in the Philippines
Radio Philippines Network
Former Solar Entertainment Corporation channels
Television channels and stations established in 2008
Television channels and stations disestablished in 2009
English-language television stations in the Philippines